Leonor Romero Sevilla (born 7 September 1958) is a Mexican politician affiliated with the PAN. As of 2013 she served as Deputy of the LXII Legislature of the Mexican Congress representing Tlaxcala.

References

1958 births
Living people
Politicians from Tabasco
Women members of the Chamber of Deputies (Mexico)
National Action Party (Mexico) politicians
21st-century Mexican politicians
21st-century Mexican women politicians
Universidad Juárez Autónoma de Tabasco alumni
People from Paraíso, Tabasco
Deputies of the LXII Legislature of Mexico
Members of the Chamber of Deputies (Mexico) for Tlaxcala